Seventy-one members of the New Zealand House of Representatives were elected from electorates in the general election on 23 September 2017.

General electorates

Auckland Central

|}

Bay of Plenty

|-
!colspan=6|Retiring incumbents and withdrawn candidates
|-

|}

Botany

|}

Christchurch Central

|-
!colspan=6|Retiring incumbents and withdrawn candidates
|-

|}

Christchurch East

|}

Clutha-Southland

|-
!colspan=6|Retiring incumbents and withdrawn candidates
|-

|}

Coromandel

|-
!colspan=6|Retiring incumbents and withdrawn candidates
|-

|}

Dunedin North

|}

Dunedin South

|}

East Coast

|}

East Coast Bays

|-
!colspan=6|Retiring incumbents and withdrawn candidates
|-

|}

Epsom

|}

Hamilton East

|-
!colspan=6|Retiring incumbents and withdrawn candidates
|-

|}

Hamilton West

|-
!colspan=6|Retiring incumbents and withdrawn candidates
|-

|}

Helensville

|-
!colspan=6|Retiring incumbents and withdrawn candidates
|-

|}

Hunua

|}

Hutt South

|-
!colspan=6|Retiring incumbents and withdrawn candidates
|-

|}

Ilam

|}

Invercargill

|}

Kaikōura

|}

Kelston

|}

Mana

|}

Māngere

|}

Manukau East

|}

Manurewa

|-
!colspan=6|Retiring incumbents and withdrawn candidates
|-

|}

Maungakiekie

|-
!colspan=6|Retiring incumbents and withdrawn candidates
|-

|}

Mount Albert

|}

Mount Roskill

|}

Napier

|-
!colspan=6|Retiring incumbents and withdrawn candidates
|-

|}

Nelson

|}

New Lynn

!colspan=6|Retiring incumbents and withdrawn candidates
|-

|}

New Plymouth

|}

North Shore

|-
!colspan=6|Retiring incumbents and withdrawn candidates
|-

|}

Northcote

|-
!colspan=6|Retiring incumbents and withdrawn candidates
|-

|}

Northland

|-
!colspan=6|Retiring incumbents and withdrawn candidates
|-

|}

Ōhāriu

|-
!colspan=6|Retiring incumbents and withdrawn candidates
|-

|}

Ōtaki

|-
!colspan=6| Retiring incumbents and withdrawn candidates
|-

|}

Pakuranga

|-
!colspan=6| Retiring incumbents and withdrawn candidates
|-

|}

Palmerston North

|}

Papakura

|}

Port Hills

|-
!colspan=6| Retiring incumbents and withdrawn candidates
|-

|}

Rangitata

!colspan=6| Retiring incumbents and withdrawn candidates
|-

|}

Rangitīkei

|}

Rimutaka

|}

Rodney

|-
!colspan=6| Retiring incumbents and withdrawn candidates
|-

|}

Rongotai

|-

!colspan=6| Retiring incumbents and withdrawn candidates
|-

|}

Rotorua

|}

Selwyn

|}

Tāmaki

|}

Taranaki-King Country

|}

Taupō

|-
!colspan=6| Retiring incumbents and withdrawn candidates
|-

|}

Tauranga

|}

Te Atatū

|}

Tukituki

|-
!colspan=6| Retiring incumbents and withdrawn candidates
|-

|}

Upper Harbour

|-
!colspan=6| Retiring incumbents and withdrawn candidates
|-

|}

Waikato

|-
!colspan=6| Retiring incumbents and withdrawn candidates
|-

|}

Waimakariri

|}

Wairarapa

|}

Waitaki

|}

Wellington Central

|-
!colspan=6|Retiring incumbents and withdrawn candidates
|-

|}

West Coast-Tasman

|}

Whanganui

|-
!colspan=6| Retiring incumbents and withdrawn candidates
|-

|}

Whangarei

|}

Wigram

 

|}

Māori electorates

Hauraki-Waikato

|}

Ikaroa-Rāwhiti

|}

Tāmaki Makaurau

|}

Te Tai Hauāuru

|}

Te Tai Tokerau

|}

Te Tai Tonga

|}

Waiariki

|}

References

2017 New Zealand general election
Candidates 2017